"Mr. Lonely" is a song performed by the American country music band Midland. It is the lead single to their second studio album Let It Roll. The band wrote the song with Josh Osborne and Shane McAnally.

Content and history
Band members Mark Wystrach, Jess Carson, and Cameron Duddy wrote the song with Shane McAnally and Josh Osborne, both of whom co-produced the recording with Dann Huff. Midland's road band guitarist Luke Cutchen plays lead guitar, and session musician Paul Franklin contributes on pedal steel guitar.

Marissa R. Moss of Rolling Stone Country described the song as " a mischievous, Texas dance hall-inspired tune in the spirit of Eddie Rabbitt" and "a tongue-in-cheek ode to embracing the role of the being someone’s late-night phone call when their other date went south." Taste of Country writer Jacklyn Krol said of the song that "The beat is retro country, but the song's lyric about a charming rogue trying to hook up with other men's women is relevant to any period" and called it an "uptempo country hall dance tune".

Music video
Duddy directed the song's music video, which features Dennis Quaid portraying a protagonist who is attacked by a number of women while Midland performs the song.

Chart performance

Weekly charts

Year-end charts

References

2019 songs
2019 singles
Big Machine Records singles
Midland (band) songs
Songs written by Jess Carson
Songs written by Cameron Duddy
Songs written by Shane McAnally
Songs written by Josh Osborne
Songs written by Mark Wystrach
Song recordings produced by Shane McAnally
Song recordings produced by Dann Huff
Music videos directed by Cameron Duddy